Cormolain is a commune in the Calvados department in the Normandy region in northwestern France.

Edward III camped with his army in Cormolain overnight on 23 July 1346 on the way to the battle of Crécy.

Population

See also
Communes of the Calvados department

References

Communes of Calvados (department)
Calvados communes articles needing translation from French Wikipedia